The Judo competition at the 2002 Asian Games was contested in sixteen weight classes, eight each for men and women at Gudeok Gymnasium.

Schedule

Medalists

Men

Women

Medal table

Participating nations
A total of 165 athletes from 30 nations competed in judo at the 2002 Asian Games:

References

2002 Asian Games Report, Pages 456–471

External links
 Official website
 

 
2002 Asian Games events
2002
Asian Games
2002 Asian Games